Rheenendal is a settlement in Garden Route District Municipality in the Western Cape province of South Africa.

References

Populated places in the Knysna Local Municipality